Nam District (literally south district) is a gu, or district, in south central Busan, South Korea. Much of Nam-gu sticks out into the Sea of Japan (East Sea), forming a peninsula which separates Suyeong Bay from Busan Harbor. It has an area of 25.91 km². Nam-gu officially became a gu of Busan in 1975. In 1995 part of Nam-gu was divided to form Suyeong-gu.

The Busan International Finance Center is located here.

Demographics
Nam-gu is home to some 300,000 people, for a population density exceeding 11,000 per square kilometer. Less than 1,000 of its inhabitants are non-Korean.

Busan Subway
The Busan Subway (line 2) passes through Nam-gu, where an interchange connects it to the highway leading to the Gwangan Bridge. Six subway stations along Busan Subway (line 2) are located in Nam-gu, going from Kyungsung University · 
Pukyong National University Station to Busan International Finance Center Station.

Geography
Nam-gu contains a total of 7 islands, all uninhabited, with a total area of only 0.3 km². Among these are the Oryukdo islets which mark the entrance to Busan Harbor. Hwangnyeong-san also marks the point where Nam-gu's borders meet those of Yeonje-gu and Busanjin-gu.

Administrative divisions

Nam-gu is divided into 6 legal dong, which altogether comprise 17 administrative dong, as follows:

Daeyeon-dong (5 administrative dong)
Yongho-dong (4 administrative dong)
Yongdang-dong 
Gamman-dong (2 administrative dong)
Uam-dong 
Munhyeon-dong (4 administrative dong)

Education

A number of institutions of higher education, including 6 universities, are located in Nam-gu. It includes Pusan University of Foreign Studies, Kyungsung University, Tongmyong University, and Pukyong National University.

Universities with graduate schools
Pusan University of Foreign Studies (PUFS)  
Pukyong National University (PKNU)   
Kyungsung University  
Tongmyong University

Other institutes of higher education
Busan Arts College
Korea Institute of Maritime and Fisheries Technology

Secondary schools
Daeyeon High School

Other features
The district is home to the United Nations Memorial Cemetery, which contains graves of United Nations Command soldiers of the Korean War.

The district also hosts Busan Naval Base.

Sister city
 Qinhuangdao, China

See also

Geography of South Korea
Subdivisions of South Korea

Notes

 Nam-gu office population register, June 30, 2006. Nam-gu website (in Korean)
 Nam-gu statistical yearbook 2004, 토지와 기후 (Toji-wa Gihu) (Land and climate), table 3.  Electronic version (HWP format)
 Nam-gu statistical yearbook 2004, 인구 (In-gu) (Population).  Electronic version (HWP format)
  Nam-gu statistical yearbook 2004, 토지와 기후 (Toji-wa Gihu) (Land and climate), table 1.  Electronic version (HWP format)

References

External links 

 Nam-gu website 
 

 
Districts of Busan